Donald James "Don" Commons (born 5 May 1952) is a retired triple jumper from Australia, who represented his country in the 1974 British Commonwealth Games in Christchurch, New Zealand.

He also represented Australia in the 1977 Summer Universiade, the 1977 Pacific Conference Games and the 1977 IAAF World Cup. He won the Australian triple jump championship in 1976 and 1977.

His brothers, Chris Commons and David Commons, were also notable athletes.

References

External links 
 
 

1952 births
Living people
Australian male triple jumpers
Athletes (track and field) at the 1974 British Commonwealth Games
Commonwealth Games competitors for Australia